Patrick R. Manning (born June 9, 1965) is a former New York State Assemblyman. Manning was first elected to the New York State Assembly in 1994.

Prior to being elected to the State Assembly, Manning served as an executive aide for then Assemblyman Glenn E. Warren and a Dutchess County Legislator for the 20th District.

As an Assemblyman, Manning remained relatively unknown outside of his district. In late 2005, Manning began making strides towards a gubernatorial campaign. He found strong support initially from within the New York Conservative Party. Manning's main opponents for the Republican nomination for governor were John Faso, the former New York Assembly Minority Leader and unsuccessful candidate for New York State Comptroller in 1998, and William Weld, the former governor of Massachusetts and unsuccessful candidate for U.S. Senate in 1996. (Weld became a resident of New York and also registered to vote in the state.)

Manning ended his gubernatorial campaign shortly after an email was sent to the press accusing him of having an extramarital affair. Manning admitted that he and his wife were divorcing and that he was dating. Manning decided to seek re-election to his Assembly seat.

In the Republican primary election on September 12, 2006, Manning was defeated by Tivoli Mayor and Dutchess County legislator Marcus Molinaro. Manning held a lead in the Columbia County portion of the district, but this was not enough to overcome Molinaro's lead in the Duchess segment.

See also
New York gubernatorial election, 2006

External links
Team Manning 2006

1965 births
Living people
Republican Party members of the New York State Assembly
People from Dutchess County, New York
Vassar College alumni